The 2015–16 Kazakhstan Basketball Championship was the 24th season of the Kazakhstan Basketball Championship, the highest professional basketball league in Kazakhstan. Its official designation in full was: XXIVth basketball Championship of the Republic of Kazakhstan for men's teams (National league).

The regular season ran from 15 January to 3 April 2016. 5 teams played 16 games each, with 8 confrontations between every side.

The playoffs ran from 13 April to 13 May 2016, BC Barsy Atyrau won their second consecutive title by beating BC Astana in the final.

Teams

Qualifying stage

Regular season

Qualifying stage

Regular season

Play-offs

Semifinals

(2) Astana vs. (3) Caspiy Aktau

(1) BC Barsy Atyrau vs. (4) PBC Kapchagay

Third place game

Caspiy Aktau vs. PBC Kapchagay

Final

BC Barsy Atyrau vs. BC Astana

All-Kazakhstan Basketball Championship Team
The league selected their choice of the best players at each position for the season.
Best combo guard:  Azim Yagodkin (Caspiy Aktau)
Best shooting guard:  Ryan Cook (Barsy Atyrau)
Best small forward:  Patrick Calathes (Astana)
Best power forward:  Anton Bykov (Kapchagay)
Best center:  Mikhail Evstigneev (Barsy Atyrau)

References

External links
National Basketball Federation Kazakhstan season profile Retrieved 22 June 2016
FIBA game center season recap Retrieved 22 June 2016
Asia-Basket season recap Retrieved 22 June 2016

Kazakhstan Basketball Championship
Championship
Kazakh